Evelyn Murrough O'Brien Toulmin (13 August 1877 – 7 January 1945) was an Anglo-Argentine cricketer.  Toulmin was a left-handed batsman who bowled right-arm slow.  The son of Reverend Frederick Bransby Toulmin and Katherine O'Brien (sister of the 13th Baron Inchiquin), he was born at Hatfield Peverel, Essex, and educated at the King's School, Oxford.

Toulmin made his first-class debut for Essex against Sussex at the County Ground, Hove, in the 1899 County Championship.  He later moved to Argentina, with him next appearing in first-class cricket for Argentina in February 1912, making three appearances against the touring Marylebone Cricket Club.  Toulin took 15 wickets in his three matches, which came at an average of 12.86.  His best innings figures of 6/60 came in the second match at the Buenos Aires Cricket Club Ground, during which he also claimed another four wickets, giving him both his only five wicket haul in an innings and his only ten wicket haul in a match.  He also scored 133 runs during the series, which came at a batting average of 22.16, with a high score of 59.  He returned to England later in 1912, playing a single first-class match for Essex against Yorkshire at the Fartown Ground, Huddersfield.

Toulmin was the third husband of Cornelia "Constance" Toulmin.  He died at Paris, France on 7 January 1945.

References

External links
Evelyn Toulmin at ESPNcricinfo
Evelyn Toulmin at CricketArchive

1877 births
1945 deaths
People from Hatfield Peverel
English cricketers
Essex cricketers
Argentine cricketers
British expatriates in Argentina